5 June is a 1942 German war film directed by Fritz Kirchhoff and starring Carl Raddatz, Joachim Brennecke and Karl Ludwig Diehl. The film depicts the events of 1940 when German forces successfully invaded France. It was shot on location in France and Germany. Constant changes to the film, often at the request of the German military, led to large cost overruns. In November 1942, the film was banned by the Minister of Public Enlightenment and Propaganda Joseph Goebbels for unspecified reasons. It has been speculated that Goebbels thought the film was not entertaining enough or wished to avoid offending the Vichy government of France.

Main cast
 Carl Raddatz as Feldwebel Richard Schulz
 Joachim Brennecke as Gefreiter Eickhoff
 Karl Ludwig Diehl as Generalmajor Lüchten
 Gisela Uhlen as Luise Reiniger
 Paul Günther as Hamann
 Ernst von Klipstein as Oberleutnant Lebsten
 Gerhard Geisler as Stabsfeldwebel Eickhoff
 Hans Richter as Norbert Nauke
 Josef Kamper as Klawitter
 Werner Völger as Retzlaff

References

Bibliography

External links

1942 films
Films of Nazi Germany
1942 war films
1940s German-language films
Films directed by Fritz Kirchhoff
Films set in France
Western Front of World War II films
Nazi World War II propaganda films
German black-and-white films
1940s German films